Jan Holobrádek (8 February 1915 – 13 January 1986) was a Czech rower. He competed in the men's eight event at the 1936 Summer Olympics.

References

External links
 

1915 births
1986 deaths
Czech male rowers
Olympic rowers of Czechoslovakia
Rowers at the 1936 Summer Olympics
People from Břeclav
Sportspeople from the South Moravian Region